Arno Kopecky is a Canadian journalist and travel writer. His book The Oil Man and the Sea: Navigating the Northern Gateway won the 2014 Edna Staebler Award, and was shortlisted for the 2014 Hubert Evans Non-Fiction Prize and the Governor General's Award for English-language non-fiction at the 2014 Governor General's Awards.

In addition to his books, Kopecky has also been published in newspapers and magazines including The Globe and Mail, The Walrus, Reader's Digest, Maclean's, The Tyee and Foreign Policy. He lives in Squamish, British Columbia.

Works
The Devil's Curve: A Journey into Power and Profit at the Amazon's Edge (2012)
The Oil Man and the Sea: Navigating the Northern Gateway (2014)

References

External links
Arno Kopecky

Journalists from British Columbia
Writers from British Columbia
Living people
21st-century Canadian non-fiction writers
Canadian travel writers
Maclean's writers and editors
Year of birth missing (living people)